Leucadendron gandogeri, also known as cloudbank ginny, is a species of plant in the genus Leucadendron. It is native to South Africa. It typically grows in fire-prone shrublands.

References

gandogeri
Flora of South Africa